Ilyinsky District is an administrative and municipal district (raion), one of the twenty-one in Ivanovo Oblast, Russia. It is located in the west of the oblast. Its administrative center is the urban locality (a settlement) of Ilyinskoye-Khovanskoye. Population:   11,103 (2002 Census);  The population of Ilyinskoye-Khovanskoye accounts for 42.3% of the district's total population.

References

Notes

Sources

Districts of Ivanovo Oblast